Igor Vladimirovich Ivanov (Russian: Игорь Владимирович Иванов; 13 September 1937 - 2000), was a Russian politician who served as the acting Head of Karachay-Cherkess Republic in 1999. He had also served as a member of the Federation Council, representative of the legislative authority of the Karachay-Cherkess Republic.

Biography

Igor Ivanov was born on 13 September 1937 in Cherkessk. In 1959, he graduated from the North Ossetian Agricultural Institute with a degree in agronomist.

Until 1962, he worked as a teacher at the Adyge-Khabl secondary school, then until 1964, at the Karachay-Cherkess Institute for the Improvement of Teachers.

From 1964 to 1968, he was the First Secretary of the Circassian City Committee of the Komsomol, then worked in the Karachay-Cherkess Regional Committee of the Komsomol. Since 1971, he was in the Circassian City Committee of the CPSU,.

From 1984 to 1986, he served as the First Secretary of the Circassian City Committee of the CPSU. From 1988 to 1995, he worked as the director of the state enterprise "Department for the operation of the Great Stavropol Canal".

On 23 June 1995, Ivanov was elected chairman of the People's Assembly of the Karachay-Cherkess Republic.

On 23 January 1996, Ivanov was sworn in to represent Karachay-Cherkessia in the Federation Council. In February 1997, he was a member of the Committee on Social Policy, and from May 1997,  he was promoted as the deputy chairman of the committee.

On 24 May 1999, at the height of the political crisis in the republic, Ivanov was appointed the acting head of Karachay-Cherkess Republic. He was officially replaced on 24 July, by Valentin Vlasov, as the acting head.

He died in 2000 at the time he left the Federation Council.

References

1937 births
2000 deaths
Date of death unknown
People from Cherkessk
Russian politicians
Members of the Federation Council of Russia (1996–2000)
Acting heads of the federal subjects of Russia
Heads of Karachay-Cherkessia